Kyaw Win (born 23 February 1948) is a Burmese politician who previously served as Minister for Planning and Finance of Myanmar from 30 March 2016 to 25 May 2018.

Early life and education 
Kyaw Win in Labutta, Irrawaddy Division, Burma (now Ayeyarwady Region, Myanmar) to Pwa Gyi and Aye Nyunt on 23 February 1948.

Career 
In 2015, Kyaw Win  was elected as a member of parliament in the Pyithu Hluttaw for the constituency of Dagon Seikkan.

In 2016, he was nominated as Minister of Planning and Finance in Htin Kyaw's inaugural Cabinet, whereupon his academic credentials came under scrutiny and he was revealed to have listed a bogus PhD on his CV from a fictitious online university, Brooklyn Park University. He resigned from his position in May 2018. The President Office accepted his resignation on 25 May 2018.

Personal life 
Kyaw Win is married to Khin Saw Yu, and has three children, Khin Nwe Nwe Win, Thiha Kyaw, and Sithu Kyaw.

References

1948 births
Living people
Finance ministers of Myanmar
Government ministers of Myanmar
Members of Pyithu Hluttaw
National League for Democracy politicians
People from Ayeyarwady Region